Earl of Ormond was a title twice created in the Peerage of Scotland, both times for members of the Douglas family. The related title Marquess of Ormond was created twice in the Peerage of Scotland for members of the House of Stuart.

The name Ormond originates from Ormond Castle at Avoch in the Black Isle, held by the Douglas family.

Douglas Earls of Ormond

The first creation of the earldom was in 1445 for the soldier Hugh Douglas, a younger brother of the 8th and 9th Earls of Douglas. Following the assassination of his brother the 8th Earl of Douglas by King James II, Ormond and his brothers renounced their allegiance to the crown and went into open rebellion. In 1455, Ormond was defeated by Royal forces at the Battle of Arkinholm and captured, tried for treason and executed, with his earldom forfeiting back to the crown.

The second creation of the earldom was in 1651 for the Master of Douglas, the eldest son & heir of the Marquess of Douglas, with a special remainder to the heirs male of his second marriage. The title became extinct in 1715.

Stuart Marquesses of Ormond

The first creation of the marquessate was in 1476 for James III's second son upon his baptism. In 1488 the Marquess of Ormond was created Duke of Ross, the titles were held concurrently until his death in 1504.

The marquessate was created a second time in 1600 as a subsidiary title for the future King Charles I, the Duke of Albany.  The title merged with the crown in 1625.

Earls of Ormond; First creation (1445)
Hugh Douglas, Earl of Ormond (d. 1455) (forfeit 1455)

Marquesses of Ormond; First creation (1476)
James Stewart, Duke of Ross and Marquess of Ormond (1476–1504), Earl of Ross from 1481 and Duke of Ross from 1488.

Marquesses of Ormond; Second creation (1600)
Charles Stuart, Duke of Albany and Marquess of Ormond (1600–1649), merged with crown 1625.

Earls of Ormond; Second creation (1651)
The subsidiary title of this Earldom was Lord Bothwell and Hartside (Peerage of Scotland, 1651).

Archibald Douglas, Earl of Angus and 1st Earl of Ormond (c. 1609–1655), son of the 1st Marquess of Douglas.

On the earl's death, the earldom passed to his younger son, who was also created Earl of Forfar in 1661, with the subsidiary title, Lord Wandell and Hartside (Peerage of Scotland, 1661).

Archibald Douglas, 1st Earl of Forfar and 2nd Earl of Ormond (1653–1712), younger son of the 1st Earl of Ormond.
Archibald Douglas, 2nd Earl of Forfar and 3rd Earl of Ormond (1692–1715) On his death without issue in 1715, both earldoms became extinct.

References

Extinct earldoms in the Peerage of Scotland
 
1445 establishments in Scotland
Noble titles created in 1445
Noble titles created in 1651
Forfeited earldoms in the Peerage of Scotland
Peerages created for eldest sons of peers

de:Marquess of Ormond